David Moran may refer to:
David Moran (diplomat) (born 1959), British ambassador to Switzerland and Liechtenstein
David Moran (Gaelic footballer) (born 1988), Irish Gaelic footballer
D. P. Moran (David Patrick Moran, 1869–1936), Irish journalist, activist and cultural-political theorist